The Jamaica Center for Arts & Learning in Jamaica, Queens, New York is a performing and visual arts center that was founded in 1972 in an effort to revitalize the surrounding business district. As of 2012, it serves more than 28,000 people annually via a 1,650 square foot gallery, a 99-seat proscenium theater, and art & music studios.  The building that houses the center is the former Queens Register of Titles and Deeds Building, a New York City landmark that is also listed on the National Register of Historic Places.  Outside the building is one of only two remaining cast-iron sidewalk clocks in New York City, as well as a late-Victorian era headquarters of the Jamaica Savings Bank next door.

Queens Register of Titles and Deeds Building
Office of the Register, also known as Queens Register of Titles and Deeds Building, is a historic government building located in the Jamaica section of the New York City borough of Queens.  It was built between 1895 and 1913 and is an imposing, three story building with a limestone facade in the Neo-Italian Renaissance style. A rear five story addition was built in 1938.  The facade features deep rustication on the first floor and a smooth ashlar surface above.  The building housed the Office of the Register until 1974, after which it became the Jamaica Center for Arts & Learning (JCAL).

It was listed on the National Register of Historic Places in 1980.

See also

First Reformed Church, which serves as the Jamaica Performing Arts Center
List of New York City Designated Landmarks in Queens
National Register of Historic Places listings in Queens County, New York

References

External links
Jamaica Center for Arts and Learning (JCAL) website
Jamaica Performing Arts (JPAC) website

Arts organizations established in 1972
Performing arts centers in New York City
Museums in Queens, New York
Art galleries established in 1972
Government buildings on the National Register of Historic Places in New York City
Renaissance Revival architecture in New York City
Jamaica, Queens
New York City Designated Landmarks in Queens, New York
Government buildings completed in 1913
Entertainment venues in Queens, New York
Cast-iron architecture in New York City
1972 establishments in New York City
National Register of Historic Places in Queens, New York